Peelipose Thomas is a politician, a lawyer and an active social worker in Pathanamthitta. He is the candidate of LDF in pathanamthitta parliament constituency. former AICC member and a former member of the State Planning Board. He is currently the chairman of KSFE.

References

External links
[]

People from Pathanamthitta
Living people
United Progressive Alliance candidates in the 2014 Indian general election
Malayali politicians
Indian National Congress politicians
Year of birth missing (living people)
Indian National Congress politicians from Kerala